Taksirani Street is a short street in eastern Shiraz from Golestan Square to Delgosha Boulevard.

Streets in Shiraz